Booton Common'' is an  biological Site of Special Scientific Interest north-west of Norwich in Norfolk. It is managed by the Norfolk Wildlife Trust and is a  Special Area of Conservation

The common has diverse habitats, including wet calcareous fen grassland, acid heath, tall fen, alder woodland and a stream. Wet hollows are floristically rich and there are a variety of breeding birds.

The site is open to the public.

References

Norfolk Wildlife Trust
Sites of Special Scientific Interest in Norfolk
Special Areas of Conservation in England